Birla Institute of Technology, Ranchi (BIT Ranchi) is a public deemed institute in Ranchi, Jharkhand, India. It was established in 1955 at Mesra, Ranchi, by the industrialist B. M. Birla. The institute was later headed by G. P. Birla, and the present chairman of the board of governors is C. K. Birla. It was declared as a deemed university under Section 3 of the UGC Act.

Every year students are admitted based on merit assessed by All India Rank (AIR) in JEE-Main-CSAB, GATE and AIPMT for its various courses.

History

The Birla Institute of Technology was established in 1955 at Mesra by industrialist and philanthropist B. M. Birla. The institute was affiliated to Patna University until 1960, and then to Ranchi University. In 1986 BIT was elevated to the status of deemed university under section 3 of the University Grants Commission Act, 1956.

BIT was the first institute in India to set up a department of space engineering and rocketry, in 1964.

The Small Industries Research and Development Organization (SIRDO) was set up in 1970 as a launching pad for small manufacturing enterprises managed by graduates of BIT. Companies created from this concept include Meditron and Alcast. This idea was appreciated by Department of Science and Technology, Government of India; and was spread to other institutes such as IITs by the Government with a concept named Science and Technological Entrepreneurs Park (STEP). The first STEP was approved and located in BIT Mesra. The entrepreneurship development cell was founded in 2007 and is run by the students. To add financial strength to this effort, BIT has set up SIDBI Centre for Innovation and Incubation (SCII) by an arrangement with Small Industries Development Bank of India (SIDBI) to provide funds for a limited period of time to new entrepreneurs, start up companies, and technology based organisations in areas of interest with the faculty of the institute.
Bit Mesra has a PARAM 10000 supercomputer at the core of its IT infrastructure.

Campus

Central facilities
Central
The CAD Laboratory is a central facility of the institute where all users – undergraduate and postgraduate students, research scholars and faculty members – can work with design and analysis software.

Central Computing Facilities (CCF)
The maintenance and upkeep of the CCF is done by the Department of Computer Science and Engineering; however the CCF is used by students and staff from all departments of the institute.

The PARAM 10000 Supercomputer was gifted to the Institute by C-DACi It supports projects that require parallel processing and multi processor capabilities.

Central Instrumentation Facility (CIF)
The Central Instrumentation Facility (CIF) was established in 2006 under the Technical Education Quality Improvement Programme, funded by the World Bank and Government of Jharkhand, to provide instrumentation facilities for advanced research, to faculty.

Central Library
The Central Library was established in 1955. It has print and electronic resources in the fields of science and technology. The collection includes 10,000 online journals, 100 print journals, 113,000 books, 2500 CDs, 60 audiocassettes and 4000 project reports.

Organisation and administration

Governance
BIT functions under the control of a Board of Governors, comprising representatives of the Ministry of Human Resource Development, Government of India, the UGC, the State Government, the Chancellor, the A.I.C.T.E., the Hindustan Charity Trust and the Institute Faculty. CK Birla is the chairman of the board of governors. The governor of the state of Jharkhand is the chancellor of the institute. The Technical Council headed by vice chancellor decides the academic policy of the institute.

University Polytechnic
The University Polytechnic was established in 2001, as a joint venture of the Department of Welfare, Government of Jharkhand and BIT, Mesra, to impart Diploma level technical education amongst the youths of Jharkhand. Its campus is located close to the National Highway 33 in the vicinity of the BIT Main campus on the outskirts of Ranchi.

Centres in India and offshore

BIT has established extension centers in cities within the country, in Allahabad, Jaipur, Kolkata, Noida, Patna, Deoghar and Lalpur and overseas, in Muscat and Ras al-Khaimah.

Allahabad Extension Centre
The Birla Institute of Technology, Allahabad Extension Centre was established in January 1998. It has five academic departments namely Department of Computer Science, Department of Electrical and Electronics Engineering, Department of Civil Engineering and Department of Mechanical Engineering. The centre has a library with a large number of
books and technical journals. A digital library for on-line access of books and journals has also been provided for staff and students.

Deoghar Extension Centre

The Jharkhand government, willing to spread BIT further across the state, made a request to the institute to establish an Extension Centre at Deoghar, Jharkhand. A MoU was signed between the Institute and the Government of Jharkhand. Thus, Birla Institute of Technology extension Deoghar commenced functioning in October 2007. As per the provisions of the MoU it was decided that 50% seats would be for students acquiring eligible qualifications from Institutions located in Jharkhand while the remaining 50% would be for students from the other states of the country. Admission has been through JEE Main with Central Counselling conducted by the Central Counselling Board.

Patna Extension Centre

Birla Institute of Technology, Patna Campus was established in 2006, on the initiative of Govt. of Bihar. The institute came into existence by Public-Private Partnership (PPP) mode under flagship management of BIT Mesra. The Chief Minister of Bihar Nitish Kumar, laid the foundation stone of the institute in December 2005. The institute started academic programme from the session 2006–07.

Birla Institute of Scientific Research
The Birla Institute of Scientific Research (BISR) is a sister concern of Birla Institute of Technology, Mesra, Ranchi which hosts an auditorium and a planetarium in its campus in Jaipur. The institute was established for promoting science education through Museum and Planetarium.

This institute has a state of the art Bioinformatics Centre in Department of Biotechnology and Bioinformatics and a Remote Sensing Department.

Academics

International Relations

 BIT Mesra is a member of the EAGER – NetWiC Project of the ASIA LINK programme of the European Commission for establishing an academic network of Higher Education in the field of wireless and mobile communication between five partner universities. An international centre for wireless and mobile communication has been created in the Department of Electronics and Communication Engineering, in co-operation with Aalborg University (Denmark), Delft University of Technology (Netherlands), Università di Roma Tor Vergata (Italy), and Institut Teknologi, Bandung (Indonesia). A double-degree ME programme in Software Defined Radio (SDR) has been jointly developed by the centre and the Centre for Teleinfrastructure, Aalborg University, Denmark.
 The institute has a student exchange agreement with Purdue University in the United States.
 The institute has an agreement with the University of Leeds in the United Kingdom for the issuance of dual degrees, a Bachelor of Engineering from BIT and a Master of Engineering from Leeds in the fields of electrical, electronic and production engineering.
 BIT Mesra is one of the two Asian educational partners of University of New Brunswick, Saint John, Canada in the field of business administration.
 BIT Mesra is one of the five Indian universities which are partners in the French "n+i" network. The "n+i" network is a consortium of 70 French engineering postgraduate schools (French: Grandes Ecoles d’Ingénieurs françaises) that have mutualised their actions in the field of international cooperation.
 BIT Mesra is an educational partner in conducting an international PhD in computer science financed by the Ministry of Education, Universities and Research, Italy. The other partners are University of Udine (Italy), University of Siena (Italy), Institute of Information Science and Technologies-Italian National Research Council (Italy), Polytechnic University of Valencia (Spain), University of Nice Sophia Antipolis (France), INRIA, Sophia Antipolis (France), B.M Birla Science Centre (India), C-DAC Hyderabad (India) and Institute of Mathematical Sciences (India).
 BIT Mesra is among five leading science and technology institutions in India eligible for Cargill Global Scholars Program working with the Institute of International Education.

National collaborations
BIT offers programs in collaboration with Indian institutes and industry.
 BIT Mesra has a memorandum of understanding with Indian Railways Institute of Mechanical and Electrical Engineering which allows candidates selected in special class railway apprentice course to undergo a four-year training programme in Mechanical Engineering at BIT Mesra.
 Institution of Engineers offers an ME programme for practising engineers to its graduates and corporate members in selected engineering disciplines in collaboration with BIT Mesra.
 The Institute of Technology and Management (ITM), Mumbai has started a collaborative research program leading to the award of PhD Degree in Management with BIT Mesra.
 BIT Mesra conducts a six-month post-graduate program in management and insurance (PGPMI) in association with ICICI Prudential Life Insurance.
 Lotus Clinical Research Academy, Bangalore conducts 2-year Master of Pharmacy course in Clinical Research, M.S. in Clinical Research and Pharmacovigilance and 1-year Postgraduate Diploma course in Bioanalytical Techniques, in academic collaboration with BIT Mesra.
 Department of Space Engineering & Rocketry has initiated collaborations with Vikram Sarabhai Space Centre, Defence Research and Development Laboratory, Research Centre Imarat, High Energy Materials Research Laboratory, Liquid Propulsion Systems Centre, Aeronautical Development Agency and Hindustan Aeronautics Limited. It has been recognised as a Centre for Training of the Scientists from DRDO and ISRO.
 Department of Applied Chemistry established Research Collaboration with Indira Gandhi Centre for Atomic Research, Kalpakkam, India, ICMR Institute, Virus Unit, Kolkata, IIT Guwahati, Assam and National Centre For Cell Science, Pune.
 Department of Mechanical Engineering has been identified by National Program for Materials and Smart Structures (NPMASS), an initiative by GOI, to establish a Micro Electro Mechanical Systems (MEMS) Design Centre.
 Department of Remote Sensing & Geoinformatics of BIT Mesra is selected for interpretation of Chandrayaan-1 data by SAC ISRO and Physical Research Laboratory along with IIT Bombay and IIT Roorkee in the country. Experience gained in this mission will be used in future Chandrayaan-2 and Mangalyaan mission.

Rankings 

Among engineering colleges, Birla Institute of Technology, Mesra ranked 17th by India Today in 2020, and fifth among private engineering colleges by Outlook India in 2022. It was ranked 38th among engineering colleges in India by the National Institutional Ranking Framework (NIRF) in 2020, 66th among universities and 85th overall. NIRF has also ranked BIT Mesra 16th in the pharmacy ranking and 58th in the management ranking.

Notable alumni
 Madhavan Chandradathan, Director, Vikram Sarabhai Space Centre (VSSC)
Shree K. Nayar, T. C. Chang Professor, Computer Science, Columbia University
Anjan Lahiri, Founder, Mindtree
 Sanjeeva Kumar Singh, Indian Archer recipient of Arjuna Award and Dronacharya Award
 Kannan Gopinathan, Former IAS and social activist
 Karan Bajaj, CEO & Founder, WhiteHat Jr
 Amit Mahto, Indian Politician
 Amit Chaudhary, COO, Lenskart
 Sanjay Nayak, CEO, Tejas Networks

See also
 Birla Institute of Technology International Centre
 Waljat Colleges of Applied Sciences
 CK Birla Group

References

External links

 Official website

 
Engineering colleges in Jharkhand
Universities and colleges in Ranchi
Deemed universities in India
All India Council for Technical Education
CK Birla Group
Educational institutions established in 1955
1955 establishments in Bihar
Business schools in Jharkhand
Jain universities and colleges
Universities and colleges in Jharkhand